Çiçek Hatun ("flower" or "blossom"; died 3 May 1498) was a consort of Sultan Mehmed the Conqueror of the Ottoman Empire. She was the mother of Sultan Cem, a pretender to the Ottoman throne.

Early years
The origins of Çiçek are controversial. Serbian, Greek, Venetian or French origins are attributed to her. According to some, she was born into a family of Turkish converts and she was the sister of Ali Bey. She married Mehmed at Constantinople and gave birth to her only son Cem on 22 December 1459.  According to Turkish tradition, all princes were expected to work as provincial governors as a part of their training. After the death of Cem's older brother in 1474, Şehzade Mustafa, he was assigned as the governor of Konya and Çiçek accompanied him.

Exile

At Egypt
After Cem's first defeat in the succession war following his father's death in 1481, the prince, Çiçek Hatun, and the rest of his household took refuge with the Mamluk Sultan in Cairo. Of all the members of Cem's household, Çiçek Hatun was his most devoted ally. Gedik Ahmed Pasha, who had been a tutor to Cem, failed to supply the prince with the support he confidently accepted his challenge to the enthronement of his older brother Bayezid. Although Cem was deserted by his tutor, he was well served by his mother Çiçek Hatun.

Cem's imprisonment
After a second defeat of Cem by Bayezid in 1482, Cem fled to Rhodes, where he was received by, Pierre d'Aubusson, Grand Master of the order of St. John of Jerusalem and a zealous opponent of the Ottoman Empire. Later on, D'Aubusson concluded a peace treaty with Bayezid, and then reached a separate agreement on Cem's captivity. He promised Bayezid to detain Cem in return for an annual payment of 35,000 ducats for his maintenance. Therefore, the Knights took the money and betrayed Cem, who thereafter became a well-treated prisoner at Rhodes.

In Egypt, Çiçek Hatun, was urging the Sultan through his wife to free and bring her son to Egypt. The letters carried by a certain Nicolas de Nicosie revealed that Cem had been communicating with his mother. Çiçek Hatun's efforts to bring her son to Egypt and use her influence in the Mamluk court by urging Qaitbay to help her in this attempt were brought to Bayezid's attention through intelligence reports from Cairo. D'Aubusson used Cem to control Çiçek Hatun and Qaitbay and to wield from them twenty thousand gold pieces by pretending to bring Cem to Egypt.

Çiçek struggled on Cem's behalf for years and served as his principal ally in his efforts to free himself from the European captivity he encountered after his defeat by his brother.

Death
She died on 3 May 1498 of Plague and was buried in Cairo. Cem's corpse, however, was returned from Naples, where he died, and was buried in the tomb of his elder brother, Mustafa.

Issue
By Mehmed II, she had a son:
 Şehzade Cem (22 December 1459 - 25 February 1495). He proclaimed himself Sultan and fought for the throne against his half-brother, Bayezid II. Defeated, he fled to Italy, where he died as a hostage in Capua, in the Kingdom of Naples. He had two sons and two daughters. His son Murad converted to Christianity and became Prince of Sayd.

In popular culture
Çiçek Hatun is played by Gamze Özçelik in the 2013 Turkish series Fatih.

References

Bibliography

1498 deaths
15th-century consorts of Ottoman sultans